The Achaeans ("the Achaeans" or "of Achaea") is one of the names in Homer which is used to refer to the Greeks collectively.

The term "Achaean" is believed to be related to the Hittite term Ahhiyawa and the Egyptian term Ekwesh which appear in texts from the Late Bronze Age and are believed to refer to the Mycenaean civilization or some part of it. 

In the historical period, the term fell into disuse as a general term for Greek people, and was generally reserved for inhabitants of the region of Achaea, a region in the north-central part of the Peloponnese. The city-states of this region later formed a confederation known as the Achaean League, which was influential during the 3rd and 2nd centuries BC.

Etymology

According to Margalit Finkelberg the name Ἀχαιοί/Ἀχαιϝοί is possibly derived, via an intermediate form *Ἀχαϝyοί, from a hypothetical older Greek form reflected in the Hittite form Aḫḫiyawā; the latter is attested in the Hittite archives, e.g. in the Tawagalawa letter. However, Robert S. P. Beekes doubted its validity and suggested a Pre-Greek *Akaywa-.

Homeric versus later use

In Homer, the term Achaeans is one of the primary terms used to refer to the Greeks as a whole. It is used 598 times in the Iliad, often accompanied by the epithet "long-haired". Other common names used in Homer are Danaans (Danaoi; used 138 times in the Iliad) and Argives (used 182 times in the Iliad) while Panhellenes ( Panhellenes, "All of the Greeks") and Hellenes (Hellenes) both appear only once; All of the aforementioned terms were used synonymously to denote a common Greek identity. In some English translations of the Iliad, the Achaeans are simply called the Greeks throughout.

Later, by the Archaic and Classical periods, the term "Achaeans" referred to inhabitants of the much smaller region of Achaea. Herodotus identified the Achaeans of the northern Peloponnese as descendants of the earlier, Homeric Achaeans. According to Pausanias, writing in the 2nd century CE, the term "Achaean" was originally given to those Greeks inhabiting the Argolis and Laconia.

Pausanias and Herodotus both recount the legend that the Achaeans were forced from their homelands by the Dorians, during the legendary Dorian invasion of the Peloponnese. They then moved into the region later called Achaea.

A scholarly consensus has not yet been reached on the origin of the historic Achaeans relative to the Homeric Achaeans and is still hotly debated. Former emphasis on presumed race, such as John A. Scott's article about the blond locks of the Achaeans as compared to the dark locks of "Mediterranean" Poseidon, on the basis of hints in Homer, has been rejected by some. The contrasting belief that "Achaeans", as understood through Homer, is "a name without a country", an ethnos created in the Epic tradition, has modern supporters among those who conclude that "Achaeans" were redefined in the 5th century BC, as contemporary speakers of Aeolic Greek.

Karl Beloch suggested there was no Dorian invasion, but rather that the Peloponnesian Dorians were the Achaeans. Eduard Meyer, disagreeing with Beloch, instead put forth the suggestion that the real-life Achaeans were mainland pre-Dorian Greeks. His conclusion is based on his research on the similarity between the languages of the Achaeans and pre-historic Arcadians. William Prentice disagreed with both, noting archeological evidence suggests the Achaeans instead migrated from "southern Asia Minor to Greece, probably settling first in lower Thessaly" probably prior to 2000 BC.

Hittite documents
Emil Forrer, a Swiss Hittitologist who worked on the Boghazköy tablets in Berlin, said the Achaeans of pre-Homeric Greece were directly associated with the term "Land of Ahhiyawa" mentioned in the Hittite texts. His conclusions at the time were challenged by other Hittitologists (i.e. Johannes Friedrich in 1927 and Albrecht Götze in 1930), as well as by Ferdinand Sommer, who published his Die Ahhijava-Urkunden ("The Ahhiyawa Documents") in 1932.

Some Hittite texts mention a nation lying to the west called Ahhiyawa. In the earliest reference to this land, a letter outlining the treaty violations of the Hittite vassal Madduwatta, it is called Ahhiya. Another important example is the Tawagalawa Letter written by an unnamed Hittite king (most probably Hattusili III) of the empire period (14th–13th century BC) to the king of Ahhiyawa, treating him as an equal and implying Miletus (Millawanda) was under his control. It also refers to an earlier "Wilusa episode" involving hostility on the part of Ahhiyawa. Ahhiya(wa) has been identified with the Achaeans of the Trojan War and the city of Wilusa with the legendary city of Troy (note the similarity with early Greek  Wilion, later  Ilion, the name of the acropolis of Troy). The exact relationship of the term Ahhiyawa to the Achaeans beyond a similarity in pronunciation was hotly debated by scholars, even following the discovery that Mycenaean Linear B is an early form of Greek; the earlier debate was summed up in 1984 by Hans G. Güterbock of the Oriental Institute. More recent research based on new readings and interpretations of the Hittite texts, as well as of the material evidence for Mycenaean contacts with the Anatolian mainland, came to the conclusion that Ahhiyawa referred to the Mycenaean world, or at least to a part of it.

Egyptian sources

It has been proposed that Ekwesh of the Egyptian records may relate to Achaea (compared to Hittite Ahhiyawa), whereas Denyen and Tanaju may relate to Classical Greek Danaoi. The earliest textual reference to the Mycenaean world is in the Annals of Thutmosis III (ca. 1479–1425 BC), which refers to messengers from the king of the Tanaju, circa 1437 BC, offering greeting gifts to the Egyptian king, in order to initiate diplomatic relations, when the latter campaigned in Syria. Tanaju is also listed in an inscription at the Mortuary Temple of Amenhotep III. The latter ruled Egypt in circa 1382–1344 BC. Moreover, a list of the cities and regions of the Tanaju is also mentioned in this inscription; among the cities listed are Mycenae, Nauplion, Kythera, Messenia and the Thebaid (region of Thebes).

During the 5th year of Pharaoh Merneptah, a confederation of Libyan and northern peoples is supposed to have attacked the western delta. Included amongst the ethnic names of the repulsed invaders is the Ekwesh or Eqwesh, whom some have seen as Achaeans, although Egyptian texts specifically mention these Ekwesh to be circumcised. Homer mentions an Achaean attack upon the delta, and Menelaus speaks of the same in Book IV of the Odyssey to Telemachus when he recounts his own return home from the Trojan War. Some ancient Greek authors also say that Helen had spent the time of the Trojan War in Egypt, and not at Troy, and that after Troy the Greeks went there to recover her.

Greek mythology
In Greek mythology, the perceived cultural divisions among the Hellenes were represented as legendary lines of descent that identified kinship groups, with each line being derived from an eponymous ancestor. Each of the Greek ethne were said to be named in honor of their respective ancestors: Achaeus of the Achaeans, Danaus of the Danaans, Cadmus of the Cadmeans (the Thebans), Hellen of the Hellenes (not to be confused with Helen of Troy), Aeolus of the Aeolians, Ion of the Ionians, and Dorus of the Dorians.

Cadmus from Phoenicia, Danaus from Egypt, and Pelops from Anatolia each gained a foothold in mainland Greece and were assimilated and Hellenized. Hellen, Graikos, Magnes, and Macedon were sons of Deucalion and Pyrrha, the only people who survived the Great Flood; the ethne were said to have originally been named Graikoi after the elder son but later renamed Hellenes after Hellen who was proved to be the strongest. Sons of Hellen and the nymph Orseis were Dorus, Xuthos, and Aeolus. Sons of Xuthos and Kreousa, daughter of Erechthea, were Ion and Achaeus.

According to Hyginus, 22 Achaeans killed 362 Trojans during their ten years at Troy.

Genealogy of the Argives

See also
Achaea (modern province)
Achaea (Roman province)
Achaean League
Achaean Federation
Aegean civilization
Denyen
Historicity of the Iliad
Homer
Mycenaean Greece
Mycenaean language
Military of Mycenaean Greece
Troy

References

Citations

Sources

External links

Mycenaean Greece
Ancient tribes in Greece
Sea Peoples
Ancient tribes in Crete

Denyen